La esposa virgen (English: The Virgin Wife) is a Mexican telenovela produced by Salvador Mejía Alejandre for Televisa in 2005. The story is a remake of 1985 Mexican telenovela Los años pasan.

On Monday, July 18, 2005, Canal de las Estrellas started broadcasting La esposa virgen weekdays at 9:00pm, replacing La madrastra. The last episode was broadcast on Friday, October 21, 2005 with Alborada replacing it on Monday, October 24, 2005.

Adela Noriega, Jorge Salinas and Sergio Sendel starred as protagonists, while Lilia Aragón, Arleth Terán and Roberto Ballesteros starred as antagonists, with César Évora, Natalia Esperón, Otto Sirgo, Delia Casanova, Luis Bayardo, Eugenio Cobo and Alejandro Ruiz starred as the Stellar performances and Ignacio López Tarso and Alma Muriel starred as special participations.

Plot 
Shortly before his death, general Francisco Ortiz marries Virginia and appoints her as his sole heiress. When Virginia and her younger brother Diego arrive to the town of San Francisco de los Arenales to bury the general, accompanied with the nephew of captain Fernando Ortiz, who despises Virginia, believing that she is a gold-digger who married her uncle for his fortune.

The only person that receives Virginia politely in the town is the municipal President, Dr. José Guadalupe Cruz, a good and honest man whose wife, Blanca, suffers from a terminal disease.

Virginia is surprised to see the ranch of the general is abandoned, without knowing that this is work of the mother of Fernando, Aurelia, who has allied with the administrator, Cristóbal, to steal the fortune that Virginia has inherited.

Aurelia hates Virginia and will try with all means that Virginia leaves the ranch because she knows if she does so, she will lose her inheritance, but if she doesn't, Aurelia is ready to resort to violence. Her hatred is even greater when she realizes that Fernando is madly love with Virginia, although Virginia only sees him as a good friend.

When Virginia meets Blanca, a sincere friendship begins between them. José Guadalupe ignores that Blanca is aware of his infidelity with a selfish and ambitious woman named Olga.

Knowing that he has little time of life, Blanca fears for the happiness of her husband and her daughter Marisol if he were to marry Olga.

Unintentionally, a passionate love is born between Virginia and José Guadalupe. Both refuse to accept it and treat each other with hostility, because they know that giving themselves to that love would be betraying the trust of Blanca.

After a marriage which was never consummated, Virginia will now have to combat hatred and the ambition of Aurelia and Cristóbal, while trying uselessly to ignore the love that she feels for José Guadalupe.

Cast 

Adela Noriega as Virginia Alfaro del Sur
Jorge Salinas as José Guadalupe Cruz Serrano - Killed by Cristobal
Sergio Sendel as Fernando Ortiz Betancourt 
Lilia Aragón as Aurelia Betancourt Vda. de Ortiz - Main villain, ends up vagabond
Roberto Ballesteros as Cristóbal - Villain, killed by José Guadalupe
César Évora as Edmundo Rivadeneira "El Loco Serenata"
Arleth Terán as Olga Barquín - Villain, commits suicide after being defaced
Natalia Esperón as Blanca de la Fuente de Cruz - Dies of a disease
Otto Sirgo as Dr. Misael Mendoza
Delia Casanova as Clemencia
Luis Bayardo as Sergio Valdez
Lourdes Munguía as Aída Palacios
Carlos Cámara Jr. as Arturo Palacios - Villain, dies of a shot
Martha Ofelia Galindo as Mariana
Arlette Pacheco as Soledad Rivadeneira
Eugenio Cobo as Father Matías
Alejandro Ruiz as Loreto Arriaga
Oscar Traven as Rolando Palacios
Hilda Aguirre as Raquela Palacios
Juan Ignacio Aranda as Dante
Raúl Sebastián Villarreal as Diego Alfaro
 Kendra Santacruz as Marisol Cruz de la Fuente - Dies after fall of the horse
 Fátima Torre as Olivia Palacios
 Odemaris Ruiz as Susana Palacios
 Alberto Salaberry as Fabián
 Daniel Gauvry as Paulino
 Bárbara Gómez as Hechicera
 Antonio Brenán as Gael
 Jorge Brenán as Gabriel
 Rubén Morales as Efrén Barquín
 José Antonio Ferral as Tomás
 Benjamín Rivero as Efraín
 Rocío Valenti as Margarita
 Claudia Ortega as Adelina
 Luis Uribe as Dr. Garza
 Alfredo Alfonso as Acosta
 Eduardo Noriega as Notario
 Alejandra Barros as Cecilia
Special participation
Ignacio López Tarso as General Francisco Ortiz - Dies of a disease
Alma Muriel as Mercedes

Awards

References

External links 
 
  at esmas.com 

2005 telenovelas
Mexican telenovelas
2005 Mexican television series debuts
2005 Mexican television series endings
Spanish-language telenovelas
Television shows set in Mexico
Televisa telenovelas